Juan Carlos Izpisua Belmonte (born December 12, 1960, in Hellín, Albacete) is a Spanish biochemist and developmental biologist.  He is a professor in the Gene Expression Laboratories at the Salk Institute for Biological Studies in La Jolla, California since 1993.

Education
Izpisua graduated from the University of Valencia, Spain with a bachelor's degree in Pharmacy and Science. He then earned a master's degree in Pharmacology from the same university before moving on to complete his Ph.D. in Biochemistry and Pharmacology at the University of Bologna, Italy and the University of Valencia, Spain. He followed that with a stage as a postdoctoral fellow in different institutions, including the European Molecular Biology Laboratory (EMBL), in Heidelberg, Germany and University of California, Los Angeles (UCLA), Los Angeles, USA prior to moving to the Salk Institute in 1993.

Career
In 2004, he helped to establish the Center for Regenerative Medicine in Barcelona and was its Director between 2004 and 2014.  He is a main catalyzer in one of today's most promising areas of biomedicine: regenerative medicine. His work may help to discover new molecules and specific gene/cell treatments to prevent and cure diseases affecting mankind both in the adult and embryonic stages, as well as inducing endogenous in vivo regenerative responses that may allow for tissue and organ regeneration in humans. It also may contribute to increase our knowledge of aging and aging-associated diseases, thereby leading to healthier aging and increased lifespan.

His conceptual discoveries and methodologies for regenerative medicine include:

 Elucidating some of the key cellular and molecular bases of how an organism with millions of cells develops from a single cell embryo after fertilization.
 Seminal discoveries towards understanding the molecular basis underlying somatic cell reprogramming
New methodologies for the differentiation of human stem cells into various cells types and organoids, like the kidney and heart.
 Development of novel stem cell models of human aging and aging-associated diseases, and discovery of new drivers of rejuvenation.
 Novel genetic and epigenetic technologies to both treat, and prevent the transmission, of mitochondrial and nuclear DNA originated diseases.
Proof of concept that iPSC technology can be used for the generation of disease corrected patient specific cells with potential value for cell therapy.
The development of methodologies for culturing embryos, including non-human primates, and creating synthetic mammalian embryos.
Development of technologies that allow differentiation of human cells inside embryos of different species. These results may allow for the generation of human tissues and organs.

Belmonte has over 500 publications describing these results. He has also received several awards and honors over the years, a notable one was the naming of a secondary school, Instituto Enseñanza Secundaria (IES) Izpisua Belmonte, in his hometown of Hellín, Albacete, Spain. In October, 2018, Belmonte was named by Time Magazine as one of the 50 Most Influential People in Healthcare of 2018.  Twice his work was among those selected by Science as the "Breakthrough of the Year," in 2008 for reprogramming and again in 2013 for the generation of mini-organs.

 Google Scholar reports >52,000 citations for Juan Carlos Izpisua Belmonte, with an h-index of 119 and an i10-index of 365.

See also

 Xenotransplantation
 Chimera (genetics)
 Gene Therapy
 Genome editing
Aging
Rejuvenation
Regeneration

References 

1960 births
Living people
Spanish biochemists
Salk Institute for Biological Studies people
University of Valencia alumni
University of Bologna alumni
People from Hellín